Antigone Costanda (born on November 13, 1932 in Alexandria) is an Egyptian designer, model and beauty queen who won Miss World 1954. The pageant took place on October 18, 1954, in London, England with the participation of 16 contestants. In addition to Arabic, Costanda speaks Greek, English, Italian and French fluently. The Greek-Egyptian beauty was the first Miss Egypt candidate to win the title of Miss World for Egypt.

According to Eric Morley's 1967 book, "The Miss World Story", Costanda was positively beaming as she claimed that her victory was also for the Miss World 1953 second runner-up status of Marina Papaelia.

The following year, during the 1955 Miss World beauty pageant held in London, Costanda did not attend the event because of political hostilities between Egypt and Britain over the Suez Canal. British actress Eunice Gayson crowned Miss Venezuela as the new Miss World.

Prior to winning Miss World, Costanda was gaining experience in the modelling profession and was appearing in numerous publications. Winning Miss World further helped her to reach the top of her profession, becoming a successful model in the Middle East, France, Italy and Greece. Her career in later years moved into interior design. She ran a company designing the interior of business buildings. She was one of the judges at the Miss Egypt 2006 contest.

External links

Miss Egypt winners
Miss World winners
Living people
Miss World 1954 delegates
1930s births
People from Alexandria
Egyptian people of Greek descent